BYEMAN codenamed LANYARD, the KH-6 was the unsuccessful first attempt to develop and deploy a very high-resolution optical reconnaissance satellite by the United States National Reconnaissance Office. Launches and launch attempts spanned the period from March to July 1963. The project was quickly put together to get imagery of a site near Leningrad suspected of having anti-ballistic missiles. The satellite carried Itek's "E-5" camera developed for the SAMOS program, which had been cancelled. The KH-6 was manufactured by Lockheed Martin and launched from Vandenberg Air Force Base on Thor-Agena D launch vehicles.

Launches 
 KH-6 8001 launch failed 18 March 1963 (NSSDC ID: P11 (1963-F03))
 KH-6 8002 launched 18 May 1963 (NSSDC ID: 1963-016A)
 KH-6 8003 launched 31 July 1963 (NSSDC ID: 1963-032A)
(NSSDC ID: Number: See COSPAR)

KH-6 8001 was launched from Vandenberg AFB aboard a Thor-Agena D launch vehicle at 00:00:00 GMT. It was the first of three KH-6 LANYARD launches. This mission was a failure because the Agena guidance system failed.

KH-6 8002 was launched from Vandenberg AFB aboard a Thor-Agena D rocket at 22:34:00 GMT. This was the second launch KH-6 LANYARD satellite. The best resolution achieved was 183 cm, the same as KH-4B. This spacecraft achieved orbit but the Agena rocket failed in flight and no film data were returned.

KH-6 8003 was launched from Vandenberg AFB aboard a Thor-Agena D rocket at 00:00:00 GMT. This was the third and final KH-6 (LANYARD) mission that was designed to provide very high-resolution photos (61 cm), but the best resolution achieved was 183 cm, the same as KH-4B, so LANYARD was discontinued after this 3rd flight in 1963. The camera failed after 32 hours. The mission was deemed a success but the image quality was poor.

The film canister contained over 2,250 feet of film with 910 photographic frames.

See also 

 CORONA KH-1 through 4 (concurrent operations)
 KH-5 ARGON
 KH-7 GAMBIT
 KH-8 GAMBIT-3 (concurrent operations)
 KH-9 HEXAGON or "Big Bird"
 KH-10 DORIAN or Manned Orbital Laboratory
 KH-11 KENNEN, KH-12, KH-13.
 Satellite imagery
 Cold War

References 

 Mark Wade (9 August 2003). KH-6 Encyclopedia Astronautica  Accessed April 23, 2004

External links 
 KH-6 Lanyard. globalsecurity.org

Surveillance
Reconnaissance satellites of the United States
Military equipment introduced in the 1960s